Kim Yong-bae (born 1931) is a South Korean former sports shooter. He competed in the 50 metre pistol event at the 1968 Summer Olympics.

References

1931 births
Living people
South Korean male sport shooters
Olympic shooters of South Korea
Shooters at the 1968 Summer Olympics
Shooters at the 1970 Asian Games
Shooters at the 1974 Asian Games
Asian Games medalists in shooting
Asian Games gold medalists for South Korea
Asian Games bronze medalists for South Korea
Medalists at the 1970 Asian Games
Medalists at the 1974 Asian Games
20th-century South Korean people
21st-century South Korean people